Composia is a genus of tiger moths in the family Erebidae. The genus was erected by Jacob Hübner in 1820.

Species
 Composia credula Fabricius, 1775
 Composia fidelissima Herrich-Schäffer, 1866
 Composia utowana Bates, 1933

References

  &  (2010). "Annotated check list of the Noctuoidea (Insecta, Lepidoptera) of North America north of Mexico". ZooKeys. 40: 1–239.

External links

 
Pericopina
Moth genera